Vacusus is a genus of antlike flower beetles in the family Anthicidae. There are about six described species in Vacusus.

Species
These six species belong to the genus Vacusus:
 Vacusus confinis (LeConte, 1851)
 Vacusus formicetorum (Wasmann, 1894)
 Vacusus infernus (LaFerté-Sénectère, 1849)
 Vacusus jamaicanus Werner
 Vacusus nigritulus (LeConte, 1851)
 Vacusus vicinus (LaFerté-Sénectère, 1849)

References

Further reading

 
 

Anthicidae
Articles created by Qbugbot